Marc Raquil (born 2 April 1977 in Créteil) is a French runner of Martiniquais origin who competes in the 400 metres and 4x400m relay.
He won the 4x400m relay gold medal and the 400m silver medal at the 2003 World Championships. In 2004, his 4x400m relay team was retroactively awarded gold medals after the United States 4x400m relay team was stripped of its gold medals due to the failed drug tests of two members of the relay (Calvin Harrison and Jerome Young). Since Jerome Young had also finished first in the 400m at the 2003 World Championships, the failed drug test also resulted in Raquil being retroactively awarded a silver medal in the 400m. Raquil has also won three gold medals and one bronze medal at the European Indoor and Outdoor Championships.

Achievements

Outdoor personal bests
200 metres - 21.03 (2001)
400 metres - 44.79 (2003)
800 metres - 1:50.90 (2003)

Later career
Raquil was prevented by injuries from competing in the 2004 and 2008 Summer Olympics and the 2007 World Championships in Athletics. He subsequently announced his retirement; nonetheless in February 2011 the French Anti-Doping Agency suspended him from competition for one year for failing to submit to periodic anti-doping tests.

References

External links

 

1977 births
Living people
French people of Martiniquais descent
French male sprinters
Athletes (track and field) at the 2000 Summer Olympics
Olympic athletes of France
World Athletics Championships medalists
European Athletics Championships medalists
World Athletics Championships winners